Hanumakonda district, (formerly Warangal Urban district) is a district located in the northern region of the Indian state of Telangana. The district headquarters are located at Hanumakonda. The district borders the districts of Jangaon, Karimnagar, Warangal, Bhupalpally and Siddipet.

The district was formed in 2016 by carving out Warangal Urban district from the erstwhile Warangal district. In August 2021, the Warangal Urban district was renamed as Hanumakonda district.

History

Formation of District 

During the rule of Nizam of Hyderabad, State of Hyderabad was divided into many small Circars. Warangal became a Circar in the early 1800s. In 1866 Circars was Abolished and merged to create districts, Warangal district was created by merging Warangal, Khummettu and part of Bhonagheer circars. Jangaon area from Bhongir Circar was transferred to warangal and  Kamalapur area of warangal transferred to Karimnagar district.  In 1905 when Princely state of Hyderabad sub divided into Four Division namely 1.Aurangabad Division, 2.Gulbarga Division, 3.Gulshanabad Division, 4.Warangal Division. During formation divisions again districts were delimited in 1905 Jangaon(Cherial) Taluka and Kodar(Kodad) Sub Taluka transferred to Nalgonda District from Warangal district. In 1905 AD, Warangal district was formed with Warangal, Parkala, Khammam, Yellandu, Mahabubabad, Madhira, Palvancha taluks and some area of old palvancha sanstan and some jagirs.This was bigger than many districts of Hyderabad state.

Warangal district was divided to facilitate administrative control and on October 1, 1953, the Khamman district was formed. Khammam, Yellandu, Madhira, Burugunpahad and Palavancha talukas have been made part of it. Warangal, Mulugu, Mahaboobabad, Parkala remained in Warangal district. But Parkala from Karimnagar and Jangaon from Nalgonda have become part of Warangal district. District uses to consist of 6 talukas and 2 revenue divisions which later increased to 15 talukas in 1979.  In 1985 when N. T. Rama Rao introduces mandal system in warangal district was divided in to 50 mandals, but again warangal mandal was curved out from Hanumakonda madal consisting only urban area of warangal which increased to total 51 mandals and revenue divisions increased to 5 in warangal district.

Geography 

Demographics 
 Census of India, the district has a population of 1,135,707.

Administrative divisions 
The district has two revenue divisions i.e., Hanumakonda and Parkal and is sub-divided into 14 mandals. Rajeevgandhi Hanumanthu is the present collector of the district.

Mandals 

Hanumakonda Revenue Division:
 Hanumakonda
 Kazipet
 Kamalapur
Hasanparthy
 Inavolu
 Velair
 Dharmasagar
Elkathurthy
 Bheemadevarpalle

Parkal Revenue Division:
 Parkal
 Nadikuda
 Damera
 Athmakur
 Shayampet

Economy 
In 2006 the Indian government named Warangal one of the country's 250 most backward districts (out of a total of 640). It is one of the thirteen districts in Andhra Pradesh currently receiving funds from the Backward Regions Grant Fund Programme (BRGF).

Culture 

In February 2013, Warangal was accorded World Heritage city status by UNESCO. A few tourist attractions include:
 Warangal Fort
 Thousand Pillar Temple
 Padmakshi Temple
 Bhadrakali Temple

A few of the notable personalities from the district include, Rudrama Devi, Kaloji Narayana Rao, Kothapalli Jayashankar, Nerella Venumadhav, and P. V. Narasimha Rao.

Transport 
National Highway 163 (India) between Hyderabad – Bhopalpatnam of Chhattisgarh, National Highway 563 (India) between Jagitial-Khammam passes through the district. Warangal has three railway stations kazipet town railway station, Kazipet Railway Station and Warangal Railway Station, which connects South and North India. The district has a small airport in Mamnoor, which can accommodate small aircraft like the ATR 42. This airport is currently used by police for gliding sorties, skeet shooting and aero-modeling.

Education 
The schools in the district are under the administration of a District Education Officer controlled by Department of Education. Some popular schools in warangal urban are st. Peters central public school, DELHI PUBLIC SCHOOL (DPS), GREENWOOD GROUP OF EDUCATIONAL INSTITUTIONS  [CBSE] in erragattugutta at KAKATIYA INSTITUTION OF TECHNOLOGY AND SCIENCE (KITS) and at hunter road, ST. GABRIEL'S in Kazipet, TEJASWI GROUP, WARANGAL PUBLIC SCHOOL, EKASHILA, S R Educentre, Waddepally.  Kashinath is the present Intermediate education officer, who oversees the junior colleges in the district for Telangana Board of Intermediate Education.

Some of the major educational institutions include, National Institute of Technology, Kakatiya Medical College, Kakatiya University, Kaloji Narayana Rao University of Health Sciences, University Arts and Science College, Kakatiya Institute of Technology and Science.

See also 
List of districts in Telangana

References

External links 

 Official website 

 
Coal mining districts in India
Districts of Telangana